Slice Inc., founded in 2008 and headquartered in Miami, Florida, is a manufacturer of small hand-held cutting tools such as box-cutters.  Its tools are designed to be safer and more ergonomic than previously manufactured tools for the same purpose.

History

Slice was founded in 2008 by T.J. Scimone.

Slice began as a product-design firm specializing in housewares and "developing ultramodern interpretations of kitchen staples like vegetable peelers and cheese graters." The company was successful in a "pocket-size ceramic blade" for opening packages and other shrink-wrapped items," according to Entrepreneur magazine, so "Scimone pivoted, vowing to make common tools like box cutters . . . both sleeker and safer." The magazine added: "It's that emphasis on aesthetics that has brought Slice to the attention of merchants outside the traditional business-to-business segment. The company's products are now available at retailers that include Michaels Stores and The Container Store, along with office-supply vendors."

Products
The company is known as "a manufacturer of cutting tools that increase industrial safety."
A couple of the company's products are:

Ceramic-Blade Box Cutter, made in two versions – one a manual, three-position and the other an auto-retract. The former was a winner of the Red Dot Design Award for tools in 2011, with its double-sided ceramic blade featuring a rounded tip.

Precision Cutter. Winner of the Good Design Award of the Chicago Athenaeum Museum of Architecture and Design in 2008, the cutter was designed by Karim Rashid, a "designer partner" within Slice. It has "a zirconium-oxide-based micro-ceramic blade that lasts longer than traditional steel blades and never rusts."

References

External links
About Slice, Inc., on the company website 
Core77, International Home and Housewares Show, 2011, statement by T.J. Scimone 
Sebil Kaede, "Advanced Safety of Cutter: Cut In With Designer's Eye," Nikkei Marketing Journal, January 9, 2012 (Japanese)

2008 establishments in California
Manufacturing companies based in Miami
Knife manufacturing companies
Manufacturing companies established in 2008